Paraburkholderia soli is a gram-negative, catalase and oxidase-positive strictly aerobic, non motile bacterium from the genus Paraburkholderia and the family Burkholderiaceae which was isolated from soil and cultivated with Korean ginseng.

References

soli
Bacteria described in 2007